The Family Values Tour 2006 is a live album released on December 26, 2006, by Firm Music, to commemorate the fourth iteration of the Family Values Tour, launched in 1998 by American nu metal band Korn. It is executive-produced by Peter Katsis and is the fourth and final Family Values record.

History 
The CD features live tracks from headliners Korn and Deftones, as well as selected cuts from some of other bands on the bill: Stone Sour, Flyleaf, Dir en grey, 10 Years, and Deadsy. Bullets and Octane, Bury Your Dead, and Walls of Jericho are not featured on the compilation.

The album debuted at #102 on the Billboard 200 chart with only 14,300 units sold in its first week.

Track listing
CD

Bonus content

Billboard charts

Album

References

Korn
2006 live albums
2006 compilation albums